Tapani Jarkko Ala-Huikku (born January 31, 1980, in Seinäjoki) is an amateur Finnish Greco-Roman wrestler, who played for the men's lightweight category. He won the bronze medal for his division at the 2007 European Wrestling Championships in Sofia, Bulgaria, and gold at the 2008 European Wrestling Championships in Tampere. He is also a member of Ilmajoen Kisailijat Wrestling Club in Ilmajoki, and is coached and trained by Seppo Yli-Hannuksela, the father of two-time Olympic medalist Marko Yli-Hannuksela.

At age twenty-eight, Ala-Huikku made his official debut at the 2008 Summer Olympics in Beijing, where he competed in the men's 60 kg class. He received a bye for the second preliminary match, before losing out to Kyrgyzstan's Ruslan Tumenbaev, who was able to score seven points in two straight periods, leaving Ala-Huikku with a single point.

At the 2012 Summer Olympics in London, Ala-Huikku, however, lost again in the second preliminary match of men's 60 kg class to France's Tarik Belmadani, with a technical score of 0–4.

Nowadays Ala-Huikku is working as sport journalist and commentator in Finnish Broadcasting Company YLE.

References

External links
Profile – International Wrestling Database
Profile – Suomen Olympiakomitea 
NBC Olympics Profile

1980 births
Living people
Olympic wrestlers of Finland
Wrestlers at the 2008 Summer Olympics
Wrestlers at the 2012 Summer Olympics
People from Seinäjoki
Finnish male sport wrestlers
Sportspeople from South Ostrobothnia
20th-century Finnish people
21st-century Finnish people